Deadbeat is an American supernatural comedy series created by Cody Heller and Brett Konner about medium Kevin Pacalioglu, played by Tyler Labine, and was first released on Hulu on April 9, 2014. On April 30, 2014, the series was renewed for a second season of 13 episodes. On May 26, 2015 the series was renewed for a third season of 13 episodes. As it did the previous year, the season premiered on April 20 (4/20) - a marijuana reference that's not uncommon throughout the series.

Series overview 

{| class="wikitable plainrowheaders" style="text-align:center;"
|-
! colspan="2"| Season
! Episodes
! Release date
|-
|-
 |style="background: #005E8D;"|
 |1
 |10
 |
|-
 |style="background: #FCDC3B;"|
 |2
 |13
 |
|-
 |style="background: #7FFF00;"|
 |3
 |13
 |
|-
|}

Episodes

Season 1 (2014)

Season 2 (2015)

Season 3 (2016)

References 

Lists of American comedy television series episodes